Royal Bank may refer to:

 Royal Bank (Azerbaijan)
 Royal Bank of Canada
 Royal Bank Plaza, headquarters of Royal Bank of Canada in Toronto, Ontario, Canada
 Royal Bank of Queensland, a former bank in Australia
 Royal Bank of Queensland, Maryborough
 Royal Bank of Scotland
 Royal Bank of Trinidad and Tobago, a subsidiary of RBC
 Royal British Bank
 Royal Canadian Bank
 Royal Trust Tower, former headquarters of Royal Trustco
 The Royal Bank, Ghana
 Banco Real, the Royal Bank of Brazil, a subsidiary of ABN AMRO
 Banque Royale, the name taken by the Banque Générale of John Law when it was acquired by the French state in 1718

See also
 Royal Trust (disambiguation)
 National bank (disambiguation)
 List of central banks
 Central bank